Guadeloupe is not a separate territory but an overseas region of France. France has a multi-party system, with numerous parties in which no one party often has a chance of gaining power alone, and parties must work with each other to form coalition governments.

The parties

Most of the French political parties are active in Guadeloupe.

In addition there are a number of regional parties:

Guadeloupe Communist Party (Parti Communiste Guadeloupéen, PCG)
Progressive Democratic Party of Guadeloupe
Popular Movement for the Liberation of Guadeloupe (Union Populaire pour la Libération de la Guadeloupe, UPLG)
Guadeloupean Objective (Objectif Guadeloupéen)
Pluralist Left (Gauche Pluriel)
United Guadaloupe, Socialism and Realities

See also
 List of political parties

 
Political parties
Guadeloupe
Guadeloupe